Lynda Durrant (born December 17, 1954) is an author of children's books. They, include The Beaded Moccasins: The Story of Mary Campbell (1998), Turtle Clan Journey (1999), Echohawk (1996), Betsy Zane, the Rose of Fort Henry (2000), and The Sun, the Rain, and the Apple Seed: A Novel of Johnny Appleseed's Life (2003), My Last Skirt (2006) and Imperfections (2008)

Personal life
Durrant was born and raised in Ohio by her parents Oliver and Shirley.  At the age of 22, she received a Bachelor's Degree from the University of Washington, and in 1979 she received her Master's.  She later married Mike Bilow, and has one child.  She currently resides in Murrells Inlet, South Carolina, and teaches writing classes and continues to write.

Awards
Lynda Durrant has received the following awards:
For Echohawk:
Young Adult Choice Award
International Reading Association Award
Books for the Teenage selection, New York Public Library
For The Beaded Moccasins: The Story of Mary Campbell:
Notable Children's Trade Book in the Field of Social Studies selection by the National Council for the Social Studies/Children's Book Council 1998
1999 Ohioana Book Award (juvenile category)
Books for the Teenage selection, New York Public Library
For Betsy Zane, the rose of Fort Henry:
Ohioana Book Award (juvenile category) OLA 2001
Quick Picks selection by the American Library Association in 2001
Books for the Teenage selection, New York Public Library
Starred review in Booklist
For "My Last Skirt" starred review in Kirkus, a Parents' Choice Award, and a Bloomer Award.
For "The Sun, the Rain, and the Appleseed" an Aesop award.
For "Imperfections" ALA Notable
For "Ariel Bradley, Spy for General Washington" 2013, Eric Hoffer Book Award.
Lynda Durrant has two optioned screenplays from her novels, 'The Beaded Moccasins, the Story of Mary Campbell' and a screenplay for the adult audience, 
'It Pours'which is based upon the novel, 'It Pours' written with Waldron Caldwell.

References

1954 births
Living people
American children's writers